Christina Theos "Chrissy" Adams (November 10, 1967 – December 27, 2016) was the tenth judicial circuit solicitor in South Carolina, a position that she served in from 2005 to 2016.

Early life
Born in Charleston, South Carolina, Adams graduated from Bishop England High School in 1985.

Career
In 1989, Adams earned a BS in Management from Clemson University and a law degree from the South Carolina School of Law in 1994. Before assuming the office of solicitor, Adams served as an assistant prosecutor in Charleston, South Carolina, and deputy solicitor for Oconee County. She was elected solicitor for the tenth judicial circuit in 2004.

Adams gained media attention following the July 26, 2015 shooting of Zachary Hammond in Seneca. Hammond's family asked that she be removed from the case due to an alleged conflict of interest. Following an investigation by South Carolina Law Enforcement Division (SLED), Adams declined to release the dashcam video of the shooting and released text messages between the victim and his girlfriend involving a drug deal.

Personal life
Adams was married to Eddie Adams. The couple had two sons. She died on December 27, 2016, at the age of 49.

References

1967 births
2016 deaths
American prosecutors
American women lawyers
American lawyers
Deaths from cancer in South Carolina
Politicians from Charleston, South Carolina
People from Seneca, South Carolina
South Carolina state solicitors
South Carolina Republicans
Clemson University alumni
University of South Carolina School of Law alumni
Women in South Carolina politics
21st-century American women lawyers
21st-century American lawyers